I Hate U may refer to:

 "I Hate U" (Prince song), 1995
 "I Hate U" (SZA song), 2021
 "I Hate U", a song by Simon Curtis from the 2011 album RA

See also
 "I Hate U, I Love U", a 2016 song by Gnash featuring Olivia O'Brien
 I Hate You (disambiguation)